Jessie Clark (born January 3, 1960 in Thebes, Arkansas) is a former professional American football player who played running back for eight seasons for the Green Bay Packers, Detroit Lions, Arizona Cardinals, and Minnesota Vikings.  

After graduating from Crossett High School in 1978, Clark played his college football at Louisiana Tech University and University of Arkansas. Clark currently resides in Phoenix, Arizona, and owns a general contracting company (H and J Builders) and is heavily invested in the car washing business.

Clark grew up one of 13 children as the son of a sharecropper.

1960 births
Living people
American football running backs
Detroit Lions players
Green Bay Packers players
Phoenix Cardinals players
Minnesota Vikings players
Arkansas Razorbacks football players
Louisiana Tech Bulldogs football players
People from Ashley County, Arkansas
People from Crossett, Arkansas